Sara Kingdom is a fictional character played by Jean Marsh in the long-running British science fiction television series Doctor Who. A security officer for Mavic Chen from the 40th century, she later joined the First Doctor and Steven to work against Chen's interests. She is sometimes classed as a companion of the First Doctor but the BBC's official Doctor Who website does not include her in their list of companions. Her status as a companion is commented upon in its Episode Guide.

Sara appeared in parts four to twelve of the twelve-part 1965 serial The Daleks' Master Plan. Only two episodes in which she appears still exist in the BBC archives. Her character took on elements of the companion role to replace the character of Katarina, who was killed off earlier in the same story.

Appearances

Television

Sara is a Space Security Agent, the sister of Bret Vyon, another agent who is aiding the Doctor in trying to defeat the Daleks. There is an implication that she was born on Mars Colony 16, where her brother had been "bred". Told that Vyon is a traitor by Mavic Chen, the Guardian of the Solar System (who was in league with the Daleks) and ordered to kill whoever is working with him, she shoots her brother and is about to do the same to the Doctor and Steven when they are transported across space to the planet Mira. There she learns, to her horror and grief, that her unquestioning obedience has not only led her to unjustly kill her brother, but also that by doing so she has prevented Vyon from warning Earth of the Dalek plot. She then joins the Doctor in his fight, briefly travelling in the TARDIS to several different locations in space and time as the Doctor and Steven try to return the ship to Kembel for a final confrontation with Mavic Chen and the Daleks.

When the Doctor activates the Time Destructor—a device that accelerates time—as part of his plan to stop the Daleks, he orders his companions back to the TARDIS for their protection. However, Sara follows him, not knowing the nature of his plan but concerned it might fail. As a result, she and the Doctor are both caught in the field of the Time Destructor as it rapidly ages everything around it. While the Doctor, being a Time Lord, can withstand the worst of the effects—merely becoming an even older man—Sara, being human, cannot. As Steven watches helplessly, Sara ages (being portrayed as an old woman by May Warden) and dies, her remains aging to dust. Steven attempts to rescue his friends; he, too, is briefly affected and ages, before he reverses the Time Destructor. This rejuvenates himself and the Doctor back to their previous ages, but does not save Sara.

Sara is by turns aggressive, independent and ruthless in her pursuit of what was right, a single-mindedness that blinded her to the larger implications of her orders. Meeting the Doctor changes that, and she turns her formidable skill and intellect to the defeat of the Daleks.

Audio drama resurrection
Jean Marsh reprised the role for the Companion Chronicles range of Big Finish Productions audio dramas, set just after the Christmas episode. In The Guardian of the Solar System, it is revealed that the TARDIS traveled back in time and Sara unintentionally met Mavic Chen over a year before the events of The Daleks' Master Plan. Sara believes her interference in this brief sidestep may have driven Chen to strike a deal with the Daleks.

In the first drama produced, Home Truths, The Doctor, Steven and Sara found a house in Ely in the far future that was so advanced, its abilities seemed like magic. It granted people's wishes. However, it did not have a conscience, and it accidentally killed its owners in response to their instinctive desires during a moment of frustration. Sara implanted a copy of her consciousness into the house to give it a human perspective to make decisions in the future, and it lived with her voice and mind and memories for over a century. Even after the civilization around it collapsed, the house lived on, a mysterious anomaly to the de-civilized humans. Many feared it, but some would explore it and Sara would make them comfortable and grant their wishes.

The third tale, Guardian of the Solar System, finds the house and Sara finally separating. She trades places with a man named Robert, to whom she had told stories and granted wishes for many years. The trade, Robert's final wish, gives him the ability to do almost anything, although it necessitates sacrificing his body. Sara is suddenly reborn in a new version of her original body, albeit slightly older and with a thousand years of memories. However, she has no idea what happened to the real Sara after she left the house. This new Sara feels lost in this new world, so Robert grants her final wish. The TARDIS materializes in front of her; inside it, the Doctor (implied to be an incarnation other than the first) wonders what force dragged it down to Earth.

Sara also features in the Early Adventures series audios An Ordinary Life, where the Doctor, Steven and Sara are forced to live in 1965 for a few weeks after damage to the TARDIS, and The Sontarans, where the Doctor, Steven and Sara encounter the Sontarans for the first time, in the form of a raid on an asteroid colony that Sara had read about in her past.

Literary appearances
Sara's first use in tie-in material was in The Dalek Outer Space Book (cover dated 1966), the last of three Dalek annuals containing short stories and comic strips licensed by the BBC between 1963 and 1965. Here she is sent on the first SSS mission, tricking the Daleks into attempting to invade Barzilla by claiming there is a large seam of pure gold. When the Daleks attack, they are defeated by a surprise force.
 
John Peel's two-book novelisation of Master Plan indicates that some six months elapsed between the seventh and eighth episodes of the serial, during which Sara, Steven and the Doctor travel together and have other adventures; Peel stated that this was in order to allow future writers to develop stories involving Sara. Sara subsequently appears in a short story entitled The Little Drummer Boy by Eddie Robson from the Big Finish book Short Trips: Companions. She is then heard in a trilogy of audio dramas in the Companion Chronicles range of Big Finish Productions. Written by Simon Guerrier, they feature Jean Marsh reprising her role as Kingdom.

She also returns in an audio adaptation of The Destroyers, an unmade script which, for Kingdom, takes place before she met the Doctor.

A ghost-like illusion of Kingdom, alongside Katarina and another deceased companion, Adric, appears in the Virgin New Adventures novel Timewyrm: Revelation by Paul Cornell. This sequence takes place largely inside the Seventh Doctor's mind, showing that the Doctor still bears the guilt of some deaths.

A race of shapeshifters known as the Ganazalum impersonate various companions, dead and living, in the Doctor Who Magazine comic strip Planet of the Dead (DWM #141-#142), Kingdom among them. Generally, the canonicity of the various Doctor Who spin-off media is open to interpretation.

Character creation

The character was created largely because the production team decided that the character of Katarina, introduced in the previous serial The Myth Makers, would not work as a regular. Thus, Sara has some of the attributes and narrative function of a traditional Doctor Who companion. However, the official BBC website cites as "myth" the notion that Sara was created as a companion to replace Katarina. There were no plans to have Sara continue as a character beyond The Daleks' Master Plan.  Marsh herself said in a 2003 interview for the Loose Cannon telesnap reconstruction that she would "definitely not" have continued in the role past Master Plan, even had it been offered to her.

A Production Diary compiled by David J. Howe, Mark Stammers and Stephen James Walker from contemporary memos and correspondence  notes that producer John Wiles and story editor Donald Tosh employed Sara Kingdom as a "short-term companion...[to] be killed off at the end of [The Daleks' Master Plan]". She was billed as "'Sara Kingdom" in the episodes "The Traitors" to "Coronas of the Sun", but her surname was dropped from the billing in her final six episodes and thus she was billed as "Sara" from "The Feast of Steven" to "Destruction of Time". Companion Steven Taylor is similarly billed simply as "Steven" throughout The Daleks' Master Plan.

Jean Marsh had previously appeared in Doctor Who playing King Richard's sister, the Princess Joanna, in The Crusade. Marsh would return to the programme in the 1989 serial Battlefield, playing Morgaine, coincidentally with Nicholas Courtney as Brigadier Lethbridge-Stewart, thus appearing in both his first and last regular Doctor Who episodes. Courtney also played Bret Vyon in Master Plan. In 2007 she appeared opposite the Sixth Doctor and Mel in the Big Finish Productions audio drama The Wishing Beast.

Proposed use after Doctor Who
According to The Official Dr. Who & the Daleks Book, Sara Kingdom was originally devised by Terry Nation as a supporting character in a proposed American-produced spin-off of Doctor Who that would have focused on Kingdom and her colleagues fighting the Daleks. A 30-minute script titled The Destroyers was created for a potential pilot episode which was never produced.

List of appearances

Television

Season 3
The Daleks' Master Plan

Audio
Home Truths
The Drowned World
The Guardian of the Solar System
The Destroyers (without the Doctor)
The Five Companions (with the Fifth Doctor)
The Anachronauts
An Ordinary Life
The Sontarans

Short stories
"The Little Drummer Boy" by Eddie Robson (Short Trips: Companions)
"The Last Song I'll Ever Sing" by Simon Exton (Missing Pieces)

Comics
"Planet of the Dead" by Lee Sullivan and John Freeman (Doctor Who Magazine 141-142) (imposter)
"The Only Good Dalek" (mentioned) by Justin Richards and Mike Collins

References

External links

Doctor Who companions
Female characters in television
Television characters introduced in 1965
Fictional women soldiers and warriors